PFK Metallurg Bekabad is an Uzbek football club based in Bekabad. They play in the Uzbekistan Super League.

History
The club was founded in 1945. Metallurg played in one of the regional zones of Soviet Second League until 1992. Since 1992 club played in Uzbekistan First League. From 1992 to 1993 club was named Madanchi. In 1994 club was renamed to Metallurg. 1997 season club finished as runner-up after Temiryo'lchi and promoted to the Uzbek League. The 2002 season Metallurg ranked at 5th place which is club's highest performance ever.

Domestic history

Stadium
The club has played its matches at Stadium named after A.Anokhin since 1960. Originally the stadium had capacity for 5,000 spectators.
In 2009 the reconstruction works started to renovate the stadium. In the Summer of 2012 the construction works finished and capacity of the all-seater stadium had been expanded to 15,000. The opening ceremony of the stadium was held on 4 August 2012 with an Uzbek League match between Metallurg and Pakhtakor which ended 1–2.

Players

Current squad

Honours
 Uzbek SSR Cup:
Winners (2): 1985, 1990

 Uzbekistan First League:
Runners-up: 1997

References

External links
 Official Website
 PFC Metallurg Bekabad at Weltfussballarchiv 
 PFC Metallurg Bekabad at Soccerway
 PFC Metallurg Bekabad at pfl.uz 

Football clubs in Uzbekistan
Association football clubs established in 1945
1945 establishments in Uzbekistan